Seguenzia matara is a species of extremely small deep water sea snail, a marine gastropod mollusk in the family Seguenziidae.

Description
The white, nacreous shell is broader (3.9 mm) than high (3.8 mm).

Distribution
This marine species occurs off South Island, New Zealand at depths between 750 m and 1029 m.

References

  Marshall (1988) New Seguenziidae (Mollusca: Gastropoda) from the Tasman, South Pacific, and Southern Antilles Basins, New Zealand Journal of Zoology 15:2, 235-247

External links
 To Encyclopedia of Life
 To World Register of Marine Species

matara
Gastropods described in 1988